Nicole Hare (born July 26, 1994) is a Canadian rower. In 2016, she was named to represent Canada at the 2016 Summer Olympics in the women's pairs event. She competed at the 2020 Summer Olympics.

References

External links

1994 births
Living people
Canadian female rowers
Sportspeople from Calgary
Rowers at the 2016 Summer Olympics
Rowers at the 2020 Summer Olympics
Olympic rowers of Canada
World Rowing Championships medalists for Canada

Washington Huskies athletes
21st-century Canadian women